Anonymous Rex may refer to:
 Anonymous Rex (novel), a 2000 novel by Eric Garcia
 Anonymous Rex (film), a 2004 film starring Daniel Baldwin and Sam Trammell